Arthur Machent (22 June 1910 – 31 December 1996) was an English professional footballer who played as a right half and right back in the Football League for Chesterfield and in non-League football for Buxton and Macclesfield.

Career
Born in Chesterfield, Derbyshire, Machent started his career with Chesterfield Church Bible Class before signing for Football League Third Division North side Chesterfield. He made three appearances for the club between 1929 and 1931, before transferring to Cheshire County League side Buxton. He spent seven years with the club before moving to Cheshire County League rivals Macclesfield. He was a virtual ever-present during the 1938–39 season, switching to right back on several occasions when Ron Hackney was unavailable. He made 47 appearances for the Silkmen in all competitions leaving the club in 1939.

Personal life
His younger brother, Stan Machent, played as an inside forward for Sheffield United and Chesterfield in the 1940s. He died on 31 December 1996 in Chesterfield at the age of 86.

External links
Allegedly a picture of him

References

1910 births
Footballers from Chesterfield
1996 deaths
English footballers
Chesterfield F.C. players
Buxton F.C. players
Macclesfield Town F.C. players
English Football League players
Association football defenders
Association football midfielders